Total Security is an American drama television series created by Steven Bochco, David Milch, Charles H. Eglee and Theresa Rebeck. The series stars James Remar, Jim Belushi, Debrah Farentino, Tracey Needham, Bill Brochtrup, Flex Alexander, Tony Plana and Kristin Bauer. The series aired on ABC from September 27, 1997, to November 8, 1997.

Cast  
James Remar as Frank Cisco
Jim Belushi as Steve Wegman
Debrah Farentino as Jody Kiplinger
Tracey Needham as Ellie Jones
Bill Brochtrup as George LaSalle
Flex Alexander as Neville Watson
Tony Plana as Luis Escobar
Kristin Bauer as Geneva Renault
Jason Biggs as Robbie Rosenfeld
Michael MacRae as Michael Miller
George Wyner as Norman Rosenfeld

Episodes

References

External links
 

1990s American drama television series
1997 American television series debuts
1997 American television series endings
English-language television shows
American Broadcasting Company original programming